Lot 30 is a township in Queens County, Prince Edward Island, Canada.  It is part of Hillsboro Parish. Lot 30 was awarded to John Murray in the 1767 land lottery.

Localities 

 Green Bay

References

30
Geography of Queens County, Prince Edward Island